John Benjamin Stewart (19 November 1924 – 11 June 2015) was a Liberal party member of the House of Commons of Canada. He was an author, expert on parliamentary procedure and professor.

He was first elected at the Antigonish—Guysborough riding in the 1962 general election then re-elected there in 1963 and 1965. After riding boundary changes, Stewart campaigned for a seat at South Western Nova in the 1968 election but lost to Louis-Roland Comeau of the Progressive Conservative party.

During his terms in Parliament, Stewart was Parliamentary Secretary to the Minister of Public Works from 1966 to 1968. He also served as Parliamentary Secretary to the Secretary of State for External Affairs in 1963 and 1964, then Parliamentary Secretary to the Secretary of State of Canada until 1965.

Stewart was appointed to the Senate of Canada in January 1984 where he remained until November 1999.

Electoral record

References

External links
 
Stewart passes at 90

1924 births
2015 deaths
Canadian senators from Nova Scotia
Liberal Party of Canada MPs
Liberal Party of Canada senators
Members of the House of Commons of Canada from Nova Scotia
People from Antigonish, Nova Scotia